Nethaji is a 1996 Tamil-language action film directed by Murthy Krishna. The film stars Sarathkumar and Lisa Ray . It and was one among Deepavali releases arrived on 10 November 1996.

Plot
Karunamurthy, an honest home minister, is forced to help terrorists kill the current governor to save his daughter Priya. Nethaji, an upright journalist, runs a newspaper called "India" and falls in love with Priya. Baba is a terrorist who smuggles arms with his right-hand Dharma. Nethaji saves the scientist Shivashankari from terrorists, and Charan, a police officer, congrats Nethaji and arrests Baba. Dharma hurts Nethaji's sister and niece Ammu and later kidnaps the latter. Dharma threatens Nethaji to kill Ammu, and Nethaji is forced to kidnap Shivashankari. Nethaji kidnaps Shivashankari and saves Ammu, and later, Charan arrests him. The rest of story is how Nethaji will be able to prove himself innocent and punish the terrorists.

Cast

Sarath Kumar as Nethaji
Lisa Ray as Priya, Nethaji's love interest
Manivannan as Mani
Babu Antony as Baba
Charan Raj as ACP Charan
Kitty as Karuna Murthy
Senthil 
Jyothi Meena
Vimalraj as Dharma
Manimala as Shivashankari
Sudha as Nethaji's sister
Baby Nikitha as Ammu, Nethaji's niece
CID Sakunthala

Soundtrack

The film score and the soundtrack were composed by Vidyasagar. The soundtrack was released in 1996 with lyrics written by Vaali.

References

External links

1996 films
Films scored by Vidyasagar
1990s Tamil-language films